Richard H. Newhouse Jr. (January 24, 1924 – April 24, 2002) was an American attorney and politician who served as a member of the Illinois Senate.

Early life and education 
Born in Louisville, Kentucky, he served as a staff sergeant in the United States Army Air Forces during World War II. He then received his bachelor's and master's degree from Boston University. Newhouse then received his Juris Doctor from University of Chicago Law School.

Career 
Newhouse moved to Chicago, Illinois and worked at The Chicago Defender. After graduating from law school, he worked as a staff attorney for the United States Department of Housing and Urban Development. He was a Democrat. From 1967 until 1991, Newhouse served in the Illinois State Senate. In 1975, Newhouse was the first African American to run for Mayor of Chicago, losing to incumbent Mayor Richard J. Daley in the Democratic Party primary.

Death 
Newhouse died at his home in Hyde Park, Illinois of heart failure.

References

External links
 

1924 births
2002 deaths
African-American state legislators in Illinois
Politicians from Chicago
Politicians from Louisville, Kentucky
Military personnel from Louisville, Kentucky
United States Army Air Forces officers
Boston University alumni
University of Chicago Law School alumni
Illinois lawyers
Democratic Party Illinois state senators
20th-century American politicians
20th-century American lawyers
20th-century African-American politicians
21st-century African-American people
Military personnel from Illinois